The 2013 European Youth Olympic Winter Festival was an international multi-sport event held between 17 and 22 February 2013, in Braşov, Romania, with some of the events also held in Râșnov, Predeal and Fundata. It was the 11th edition of the European Youth Olympic Winter Festival.

It was organized by the Romanian Olympic and Sports Committee (COSR), headed by Octavian Morariu. 1,465 athletes, aged between 14 and 18, from 45 nations participated in 36 events of eight disciplines. It was the first multi-sport competition hosted by Romania since the 1981 Summer Universiade that took place in Bucharest.

Organization

Venues

The budget spent for the organization was €1.15 million, while for the construction of the venues came to a total cost of €60 million.

The Brașov Olympic Ice Rink raised to a cost of €11 million and was built entirely from public resources, being opened in May 2008. It hosted ice hockey.

The Ministry of Regional Development and Tourism of Romania spent €28 million on upgrading facilities at Poiana Brașov, which hosted the figure skating, alpine skiing and speed skating events, and €4 million at Predeal. The Râșnov Sports Complex, primarily financed through sponsorships, has also received ministry contribution. The three smaller hills were raised from non-government sources, but the K90 with money from the MDRT.

The Cheile Grădiştei Arena from Fundata belonged to a private investor, Ovidiu Gârbacea.

Volunteers
The organizing committee was supported by 480 volunteers, divided into several departments, after a selection which consisted in psycho-pedagogical interviews, foreign language knowledge and sportive abilities. Experience accumulated in organizing other events and volunteering activities was also taken into account.

They participated in all scheduled activities at the competition that were held from 17 to 22 February. Most volunteers worked a maximum of 10 hours per day. For this reason, volunteers took shifts in some of the activities. All volunteers were dressed in the same uniform, marked with the logos of the competition.

Marketing

Logo
The logo was designed in the shape of a snowflake in the five Olympic colors. The main idea behind it was that each snowflake is different from another, and while they are so fragile independently, they become together, similarly to how each athlete has their own strengths and qualities, and how team spirit makes them even greater.

Mascot
The Carpathian Brown Bear Martin was the official mascot of the festival. Often present in Romanian culture, it inspired songs and tales, this type of bear being considered to be Romanian, due to its large presence in the Romanian Carpathian Mountains. Martin was dressed in red, yellow and blue, representing the colors of the Romanian national flag.

Medals
The medals were produced by a company in Bucharest that has an experience of over 20 years in the field. They were cast in gold, silver and bronze and attached to a multicolor cord having the colors of the Olympic circles.

Applications for IPhone and IPad
Free applications for IPhone, IPad, tablets and smartphones were launched on February 15, also available on iTunes and Google Play. The application contained the schedule of the competition, information about the organizers and sponsors. During the competition, the sport results were updated in 30 minutes after the end of the races.

Official stores
In each location where the festival competitions took place, there was a store with promotional items and souvenirs, such as miniature mascots, magnets, pins, inscriptioned mugs, etc.

Media coverage
The host broadcaster was the Romanian Television (TVR). It used its own cameras and crews.

Calendar

Festival

Opening ceremony
The event was officially opened by Prime Minister Victor Ponta, who was accompanied by the Mayor of Braşov George Scripcaru and the International Olympic Committee President Jacques Rogge. Approximately 3,000 spectators attended the opening ceremony, which was held outdoors on the Ion Țiriac Arena of the Sports High School, at the foothill of the Tâmpa Mountain. The Olympic torch was carried into the arena by Rareș Dumitrescu and Mihai Covaliu. The latter had the mission to carry the Olympic flame in the last part of the route and to light the torch. The olympic oath followed, uttered by athletes, referees and trainers.

Sports

Participating nations

Medal table

References

External links
Official website
Official page at Facebook
Presentation video at YouTube
Facilities presentation at YouTube

 
European Youth Olympic Winter Festival
European Youth Olympic Winter Festival
European Youth Olympic Winter Festival
European Youth Olympic Winter Festival, 2013
Youth sport in Romania
Sport in Brașov
Youth Winter
Multi-sport events in Romania
Sports festivals in Romania
2013 in youth sport
February 2013 sports events in Romania